Kiboga is a town in the Buganda Region of Uganda. It is the main municipal, administrative, and commercial center of Kiboga District, and the district headquarters are located there.

Location
The geographical coordinates of Kiboga Town Council are 0°55'03.0"N, 31°45'36.0"E (Latitude:0.9175; Longitude:31.7600).

Population
The population of Kiboga was estimated at 12,000 during the 2002 national population census. In 2010, the Uganda Bureau of Statistics (UBOS) estimated the population at 16,600. In 2011, UBOS estimated the mid-year population at 17,400. During the 2014 national population census, the population was enumerated at 19,591.

In 2015, UBOS estimated the population of Kiboga Town Council at 19,700. In 2020, the statistics agency estimated the mid-year population of the town at 22,400 inhabitants. Of these, 11,500 (51.3 percent) were females and 10,900 (48.7 percent) were males. UBOS calculated that the population of Kiboga Town expanded at an average rate of 2.6 percent annually, between 2015 and 2020.

Points of interest
The following points of interest are found in or near the town of Kiboga: (a) the headquarters of Kiboga District Administration (b) the offices of Kiboga Town Council and (c) Kiboga Central Market.

Kiboga General Hospital, a 100-bed public hospital,  administered by the Uganda Ministry of Health is located in the middle of town. The Kampala-Hoima Road, passes through the middle of town in a northwest-southeast direction.

References

External links
   Kiboga Town in Ruins Following Devastating Rain Storm
 Kiboga In Ruins Following Storm

Populated places in Central Region, Uganda
Cities in the Great Rift Valley
Kiboga District